Co Hoogedoorn (born 25 September 1952) is a Dutch former professional racing cyclist. He rode in the 1976 Tour de France.

References

External links
 

1952 births
Living people
Dutch male cyclists
Cyclists from Amsterdam
20th-century Dutch people